Harish Poptani is a University of Liverpool's Professor and Chair of the center for Preclinical Imaging. He did his PhD in Radiology from Sanjay Gandhi Postgraduate Institute of Medical Sciences and MS in Organic Chemistry from University of Lucknow.

References

Living people
Year of birth missing (living people)
Sanjay Gandhi Postgraduate Institute of Medical Sciences alumni
University of Lucknow alumni
Academics of the University of Liverpool